Rhamnus alaternus is a species of flowering plant in the buckthorn family Rhamnaceae, known by the common names Italian buckthorn or Mediterranean buckthorn. It is a hardy medium-sized evergreen shrub with fragrant flowers.

Etymology
The specific Latin name alaternus, is from the Latin word for the plant. Its origin is obscure but is often suggested to be of Etruscan or pre-Indo-European Mediterranean origin.

Description

The small fragrant flowers are gathered in a short axillary yellow-green raceme. The flowering period extends from February to April. The drupes  darken to black when ripe.

Distribution and habitat
This species is widespread in thermophilic evergreen bush and scrubland of the Mediterranean climate regions, from Gran Canaria, Morocco and Portugal in the west, to the Levant in the east, from sea level up to  altitude.

Invasiveness
In Australia, where it was introduced as a garden shrub, it has become a serious invasive woody weed in many areas, especially coastal parts of SE Australia. Here it displaces native shrubs of similar size such as the sea box, Alyxia buxifolia (an endemic plant which had an important medicinal role for aboriginal people). It prevents subshrubs and herbaceous ground cover native plants from surviving due the heavy shade and competition for moisture and nutrients. It can form dense thickets with very low biodiversity.

Cultivation
This species is cultivated as an ornamental garden shrub, valued for its glossy evergreen leaves and red berries. The variegated cultivar 'Argenteovariegata' has gained the Royal Horticultural Society's Award of Garden Merit.

Subspecies
 Rhamnus alaternus subsp. alaternus
 Rhamnus alaternus subsp. myrtifolia (Willk.) Maire
 Rhamnus alaternus subsp. pendula (Pamp.) Jafri

Gallery

References

 Pignatti S. - Flora d'Italia - Edagricole – 1982 Vol. II, pg. 78
 Plants.USDA
 Biolib

External links

 Acta Plantarum
 Schede di Botanica

alaternus
Garden plants of Europe
Drought-tolerant plants
Plants described in 1753
Taxa named by Carl Linnaeus
Flora of Malta